Coscinia romeii is a moth of the family Erebidae. It was described by Ignacio de Sagarra in 1924. It is found in Spain.

The wingspan is 24–32 mm. Adults are on wing in September.

The larvae feed on Stipa and Brachypodium species. Larvae can be found from October to June.

References

External links
García-Barros, E.; Martín, J. & Munguira, M. L. "Coscinia romeii Sagarra, 1924". Libro Rojo de los Invertebrados de España [Red Book of Invertebrates of Spain].

Callimorphina
Moths described in 1924